József Horváth may refer to:

József Horváth (footballer, born 1890) (1890-1945), Hungarian association football player
József Horváth (equestrian) (born 1947), Hungarian Olympic equestrian
József Horváth (handballer) (1947–2022), Hungarian Olympic handball player
József Horváth (footballer, born 1949), Hungarian association football player
József Horváth (chess player) (born 1964), Hungarian chess Grandmaster
József Horváth (athlete) (born 1984), Hungarian athlete